Spercheus is a genus of aquatic beetles which are placed in a family of their own, Spercheidae within the Hydrophiloidea. About 20 species are known from around the world except the Nearctic with the majority being from the Oriental and Afrotropical Realms.

All life stages are found in shallow still water with rich vegetation, which in some species includes temporary saline pools. Adults and larvae live attached to pieces of vegetation or debris, and also walk on the underside of the water surface. Air is held in a bubble on the underside of the body. The larvae feed on grazed detritus as well as drifting algae, dead organsims, and other organic refuse. The adults live as filter feeders on floating debris like decaying plant material and other decomposing organic remains. The adult females build a silken-egg case which they attach to their mid-tibiae and held by the hind legs, carried below the abdomen. These beetles were formerly placed in the family Hydrophilidae but are distinctive.

The front of the head is notched and the 7–9 segmented antenna has the terminal 3–4 segments club like and an enlarged fourth segment. The elytra are very convex and one or two abdominal segments extend beyond the apex. They have 5 tarsal segments on all legs.

Possible fossils of Spercheus have been described from the Eocene aged Bembridge Marls of the Isle of Wight, England. The extinct genus Prospercheus from the Late Jurassic of Shar-Teg, Mongolia, has also been considered a close relative of Spercheus, and also placed in Spercheidae.

Species 
 Spercheus belli 
 Spercheus belli babylonicus 
 Spercheus burgeoni 
 Spercheus cerisyi 
 Spercheus crenulatus 
 Spercheus emarginatus 
 Spercheus fimbriicollis 
 Spercheus gerardi 
 Spercheus halophilus 
 Spercheus hanseni 
 Spercheus hovanus 
 Spercheus humeralis 
 Spercheus platycephalus 
 Spercheus platycephalus interruptus 
 Spercheus senegalensis 
 Spercheus siamensis 
 Spercheus spangleri 
 Spercheus stangli 
 Spercheus stasimus 
 Spercheus wattsi

References

External links 
 Australian Freshwater Invertebrates
 Tree of Life

Hydrophiloidea
Polyphaga genera